Peru – LaSalle station was a Chicago, Rock Island and Pacific Railroad station situated between the towns of Peru and LaSalle, Illinois. The station building—which still exists as a lawn and garden center—is located on the north side of the track, on 1st Street. LaSalle/Peru was the original eastern terminus of the Rock Island Line, as it first traveled from Rock Island, Illinois to connect with the Illinois and Michigan Canal. "The Rock" was eventually liquidated, and now the track is operated by CSX, with the Iowa Interstate Railway getting some service via trackage rights.

References

External links

View of the back
View of the front

Former Chicago, Rock Island and Pacific Railroad stations
Former railway stations in Illinois
Railway stations in LaSalle County, Illinois